The Chestnut Hill West Line is a commuter rail line in the SEPTA Regional Rail network. It connects Northwest Philadelphia, including the eponymous neighborhood of Chestnut Hill, as well as West Mount Airy and Germantown, to Center City.

Route description
The Chestnut Hill West Line branches off from Amtrak's Northeast Corridor at North Philadelphia station and runs entirely within the City of Philadelphia. Its terminal is named Chestnut Hill West to distinguish it from the end of the Chestnut Hill East Line (a competing line of the Reading Company until 1976, when SEPTA assumed operations). Some stations are less than half a mile apart, a characteristic more commonly seen in an urban rapid transit system rather than a commuter rail line. The line runs roughly parallel to the Chestnut Hill East, and the two terminals are rather close. The line is fully grade-separated.

History

The line was originally opened June 11, 1884 by the Philadelphia, Germantown and Chestnut Hill Railroad, and was operated by the Pennsylvania Railroad until 1968. Electrified service began on March 30, 1918. The Penn Central operated it until 1976, turning operations over to Conrail until 1983, when SEPTA took over.

Between 1984–2010 the route was designated R8 Chestnut Hill West as part of SEPTA's diametrical reorganization of its lines. Chestnut Hill West trains operated through the city center to the Fox Chase Line. Plans had called for the line to be paired with West Chester/Elwyn Line and designated R3, but this depended on a never-built Swampoodle Connection from the Chestnut Hill West Line to the Norristown Line; this would have connected it to the former Reading Company side of the Center City Commuter Connection. , most weekday Chestnut Hill West Line trains pass through Center City and terminate at Temple University while most weekend trains continue through Center City to the West Trenton Line. While the line runs generally northbound between 30th St and Chestnut Hill West, it is considered to run timetable south. This anomaly exists because SEPTA considers ex-Reading lines (including the Fox Chase Line) to run timetable north and ex-Pennsylvania lines to run timetable south.

Between June 26, 1987 – December 17, 1989 service terminated at Allen Lane with shuttle buses serving St. Martin's, Highland and Chestnut Hill West because of unsafe conditions on the Cresheim Valley bridge. The original iron bridge dated to 1884 and was replaced with a $7.6 million steel structure financed by the Urban Mass Transportation Administration.

SEPTA activated positive train control on the Chestnut Hill West Line on August 22, 2016.

On April 9, 2020, the line was suspended indefinitely due to the COVID-19 pandemic, though North Philadelphia station was still being served by other rail services. In addition to reduced ridership from the COVID-19 pandemic, service on the Chestnut Hill West Line was also suspended due to Amtrak construction along the Northeast Corridor that the line uses for part of its route. Service on the Chestnut Hill West Line resumed on March 8, 2021 on a limited schedule, with service running Monday through Friday. Weekend service was restored on December 19, 2021.

Stations 

The Chestnut Hill West makes the following station stops after leaving 30th Street Station; stations indicated with gray background are closed. The entirety of the route is located within Philadelphia city limits.

Ridership 
Yearly ridership on the Chestnut Hill West Line between FY 2008–FY 2019 has remained steady around 1.3–1.6 million:

Notes

References

External links

 
SEPTA Regional Rail
Pennsylvania Railroad lines
Chestnut Hill, Philadelphia
Germantown, Philadelphia
Mount Airy, Philadelphia
Railway lines opened in 1884